Stage Left: A Story of Theater in San Francisco (2011) is a documentary film about the history of theater in the San Francisco Bay Area from about 1952 until 2010. The film was directed by Austin Forbord, and features Robin Williams, Peter Coyote, Herbert Blau, Tony Taccone, Oskar Eustis, Bill Irwin, Joan Holden, R. G. Davis, Richard "Scrumbly" Koldewyn, and is narrated by Marga Gomez.

The film premiered at the Mill Valley Film Festival in October 2011 and aired on KQED-TV on November 11, 2012.

External links
Stage Left at IMDB
Official website

2011 films
Theatre in the San Francisco Bay Area
Documentary films about San Francisco
American documentary films
2011 documentary films
Documentary films about theatre
History of theatre
2010s English-language films
2010s American films